Xie Zuowei (born January 1964) is a Chinese chemist and the dean of Faculty of Science, the Chinese University of Hong Kong. He is a member of the China Chemical Society.

Education
Xie was born in Cangnan County, Zhejiang in January 1964. He secondary studied at Lingxi High School. After the resumption of college entrance examination, he entered Hangzhou University (now Zhejiang University), where he graduated in July 1983. He received his master's degree and doctor's degree from Shanghai Institute of Organic Chemistry, China Academy of Sciences (CAS) in 1986 and 1990, respectively. He did post-doctoral research at the University of Southern California from 1991 to 1995.

Career
In 1995 he joined the faculty of the Chinese University of Hong Kong and was promoted to full professor in 2002. He is now the dean of Faculty of Science, the Chinese University of Hong Kong.

Honours and awards
 1997 State Natural Science Award (Third Class)
 2001 National Science Fund for Distinguished Young Scholars
 November 2017 Member of the Chinese Academy of Sciences (CAS)

References

1964 births
Living people
People from Cangnan County
Zhejiang University alumni
University of Southern California alumni
Chemists from Zhejiang
Members of the Chinese Academy of Sciences
Scientists from Wenzhou
Members of the Election Committee of Hong Kong, 2021–2026